Green Mountain is a mountain summit on the eastern flank of the Front Range of the Rocky Mountains of North America. The mountain is renowned for the Flatirons rock formations on its eastern flank.

Mountain

See also

List of Colorado mountain ranges
List of Colorado mountain summits
List of Colorado fourteeners
List of Colorado 4000 meter prominent summits
List of the most prominent summits of Colorado
List of Colorado county high points

References

External links

Mountains of Colorado
Mountains of Boulder County, Colorado
North American 2000 m summits